Brayann Pereira (born 21 May 2003) is a French professional footballer who plays for  club FBBP01 on loan from Auxerre.

Club career 
Brayann Pereira made his professional debut for RC Lens on the 22 January 2022, replacing Gaël Kakuta in the 83rd minute of a 2–0 home Ligue 1 loss against Olympique de Marseille, as his side was already two scores down at the Stade Bollaert-Delelis.

On 12 July 2022, Pereira signed a three-year contract with Auxerre. On 2 February 2023, Pereira was loaned to FBBP01 in Championnat National.

International career
Pereira was born in France, and is of Angolan and Congolese descent. He is a youth international for France.

References

External links

2003 births
French sportspeople of Angolan descent
French sportspeople of Republic of the Congo descent
Sportspeople from Oise
Footballers from Hauts-de-France
Living people
French footballers
France youth international footballers
Association football defenders
RC Lens players
AJ Auxerre players
Football Bourg-en-Bresse Péronnas 01 players
Ligue 1 players
Championnat National 2 players